There are several portraits of the Italian goldsmith and sculptor Benvenuto Cellini (1500–1570). Including self-portraits and portraits of him by other artists. Benvenuto Cellini's physical appearance is determined based on a number of his lifetime portraits. However, due to a few known portraits from the 17th – 20th century, where the artists drew Cellini's facial traits from their imagination, as well as because of past posthumous erroneous attributions, there is a level of confusion on this subject.

Portrait of Benvenuto Cellini on the Vasari Fresco 
The portrait of Cellini is situated among the images of other court artists of the Florentine Duke Cosimo I di Medici on a round-shaped fresco (tondo) made by Giorgio Vasari in the Florentine Palazzo Vecchio in 1563. Right under the picture of the already aging Cellini one finds a caption reading "Benvenuto SCVL".

All the personalities shown on the tondo were recognizable during Vasari's time.

There are 11 individuals portrayed on the tondo. Giorgio Vasari mentioned nine of them in his written comments and inscriptions located on the right of the fresco: Tribolo (Niccolo di Raffaello di Nicolo dei Pericoli), Tasso (Giovanni Battista del Tasso), Nanni Unghero, San Marino, Giorgio Vasari, Baccio Bandinelli, Bartolomeo Ammanati, Benvenuto Cellini and Francesco Di ser Jacopo. Giorgio Vasari failed to mention only one of his colleagues: Luca Martini.

Portrait of Bartolomeo Ammanatti wrongly attributed as portrait of Benvenuto Cellini 
In 1891, French book-publisher Eugene Plon called into question the attribution of personalities on the fresco, which had until then been regarded as authentic since the 16th century. Although most personalities, including Cellini himself, appear in the fresco undersigned by Vasari with their real names, Plon nevertheless cast doubt over the caption's accuracy. As the result of his studies, Plon claimed in his book that "the real" Cellini in the fresco is the man that would later be identified as Bartolomeo Ammannati. Contemporary studies made in 1971 re-attributed the personalities shown in the tondo.

Portrait of Giorgio Vasari wrongly attributed as portrait of Benvenuto Cellini 
By the end of the 18th century, a third attribution of Cellini's face had been made on the fresco housed in the Palazzo Vecchio. This version belongs to British artist and engraver Joseph Collyer (1748 –1827).  In 1829 Francesco Tassi claimed that Collyer had been commissioned to make the engraving of "portrait Benvenuto Cellini" by the British publisher "Nugent". Looking for the correct face of Benvenuto, the English artist relied on Cellini's image in Vasari's tondo.  But Collyer simply failed to properly identify the sculptor among the other personalities on the fresco. He erroneously thought that Cellini was the man placed at the very bottom of the tondo. Collyer's Benvenuto was the man shown talking to Francesco di Ser Jacopo, and looking over his shoulder towards the viewer. In other words, the British master created "A Portrait of Benvenuto Cellini" in 1771, as a portrait of the painting's author Giorgio Vasari, and not actually of Benvenuto Cellini.

Portrait of Benvenuto Cellini by Raffaello Morghen 
Two and a half centuries after Vasari's tondo was painted, the Italian artist Raffaello Sanzio Morghen (1758–1833) used the portrait in the fresco at the Palazzo Vecchio as a sample for his engraved "Portrait of Benvenuto Cellini". Morghen's picture was largely propagated by publishers of the time. These days the work of Raffaello Sanzio Morghen and its derivatives remain Cellini's best-known and most widely reproduced image.

Self-Portraits of Cellini

Self-Portrait of Benvenuto Cellini on the bust of Cosimo I Medici 

Upon his return from France to his hometown Florence in 1545, Benvenuto cast a bronze bust of Cosimo I Medici, the Grand Duke of Tuscany. The decorative head located on the right shoulder of this bust is a self-portrait of Cellini, composed with lineaments of satyr, lion and man. Although the head on the shoulder possesses animalistic elements, the relief is anthropomorphic.

Cellini took the lion and Satyr as prototypes. The lion, as the part of the grotesque image on the bust, is an allusion to Cellini himself.  The animalistic features of the Satyr, in combination with the human face, acquire an even more explicit hint at Cellini's personality than the semiotic value of the lion image. By presenting himself in the guise of a Satyr, Benvenuto alludes to his own nickname "Diablo". In the minds of Renaissance society, a Satyr was synonymous with the demon, if not the "Devil" himself.
Dr. Pope Hennessy guesses that the horns on the Duke's armor are a hint at Cosmo di Medici's Zodiac sign, the Capricorn.

Benvenuto Cellini's self-portrait on a sketch from the Royal Library in Turin 
The Royal Library of Turin (Biblioteca Reale di Torino) houses two sketches of Benvenuto Cellini drawn on both sides of one sheet of paper measuring 28.3 cm by 18.5 cm.   One side of the paper bears a graphite drawing of a bearded man aged about 45, which is identified as the self-portrait. On the overleaf one finds pen-and-ink studies of male bodies and a face in profile. Several autographs in Benvenuto's own hand accompany the drawing; and among the notes is a date reading: “July 21, 1559”.

Self-portrait of Benvenuto Cellini on the head of Perseus 
There is a tradition that the back side of the head of Perseus was designed as a self-portrait.

Self-portraits of Benvenuto Cellini as Jupiter (Perseus) and Ocean (Salt cellar of Francis I) 
An inscription bearing the words "TE FILI SIQUIS LAESERIT ULTOR ERO" is carved on the marble cartouche beneath Jupiter's niche on the base of Cellini's "Perseus". The traits of Jupiter, although very idealized, resemble the facial traits of Neptune (Oceane) found on the famous "Salt cellar of the King Francois I" made by Cellini. The salt cellar (26 x 33,5 cm., gold, covered in part by enamel; base: ebony) is his only known goldsmith masterwork which has survived to our time.  It was executed by Benvenuto right after his imprisonment, between 1540 and 1543, hence, ten years prior to casting his Jupiter in Florence.

The features on the faces of both gods could hint at characteristic peculiarities of Benvenuto’s appearance, found on other portraits of the sculptor.

Portrait of Benvenuto Cellini on porphyry stone 
The French 19th century editor Eugene Plon, besides mistakenly attempting to re-attribute personages of Vasari's fresco in Palazzo Vecchio, entered into the field of public awareness an artifact, known today as the "porphyry portrait of Benvenuto Cellini". He wrote:

This artifact is kept today at the National Museum of Renaissance in Château d’Ecouen, France.  This portrait is presently attributed to Francesco Salviati. 

Plon dates the 8,5 cm medallion to the first half of the 16th century and he believes that the piece is the exact depiction of the "portrait of messer Benvenuto in nut-wood frame", which in accordance with the notary public's evidence, hung on a wall in the goldsmith's house at the moment of Benvenuto death. Plon claims that "several portraits made on porphyritic stone are kept in the Pitti Gallery" and that "all of them date back to the same epoch as regards the time of their creation." However, scholars disprove this claim. The data available nowadays suggests that only two portraits on porphyry ever existed. One of them shows the so-called "Benvenuto Cellini" and the other one, "Ferdinando I Medici".

In 1971, The State Post of Romania issued a stamp in occasion of the 400th anniversary since Cellini's death. The "porphyry portrait" was chosen as the basis for the stamp. Although in 2007, the Parisian auction house "Drouot" sold a picture attributed as "Portrait of Monsieur Strozzi" by an unknown follower of Cornelius de Lion. This picture is signed. 

The inscription identifies the sitter as "Monsieur Strozzi".  "Monsieur Strozzi" and "Benvenuto Cellini" are therefore portrayed as being the same person.

Portrait of Benvenuto Cellini by Zocchi-Allegrini 

A re-discovery of Cellini's book by the public at the end of the 18th century brought up an acute need for the portrait of the author, in order to illustrate the publications. Many artists and engravers received orders from the publishers to produce Benvenuto's images. The earliest sample of the portraits of the "new wave" was an engraving made by the Italian master Francesco Allegrini in 1762. Allegrini used a drawing of Giuseppe Zocchi as the basis for this work. (1711–1767).

It is not known what sources Giuseppe Zocchi used in his 18 century for the inspiration, but the image of "Cellini" he created stands very wide apart from the portrait of Benvenuto on Vasari's fresco.
The Allegrini/Zocchi print was purchased by Louis-Philippe, (that time the Duke of Orleans, and later became the King of France) for his collection. At present, a copy of ‘Portrait of Benvenuto Cellini’ of Zocchi/Allegrini is kept at the Palace of Versailles and Trianon.

Benvenuto Cellini on Other Works

Sculpture by Jean-Jacque Feuchere 
French sculptor Jean-Jacques Feuchere (1807–1852) cast the small bronze sculpture "Cellini" in 1837. This portrait bears some similarity with the personage on the Vasari tondo.  Feuchere, Jean-Jacques. Benvenuto Cellini, Bronze. (1837)

The Marrel Brothers Cup 
King of France Louis-Philippe purchased the Marrel Brothers Cup in order to hand this work of art to his son Louis, Duke of Nemours as a gift. The event occurred in 1839 during an industrial exhibition in Paris.

Goldsmiths and companions Antoine-Benoit-Roch and Jean-Pierre-Nazaire Marrel produced their masterpiece on a wave of inspiration from Cellini's so-called "Augsburg's Cup" that was purchased by the Louvre Museum in 1832. The latter cup had the form of a silver chalice with gilding. The authorship of the "Augsburg's cup"was attributed to Benvenuto at that time.  The Marrel Brothers were impressed by the events, and responded with their own creation.

Bust by Vincenzo Gajassi 

The Italian sculptor Vincenzo di Marco Fabio Apolloni (‘Gajassi’) created a marble bust of Benvenuto Cellini in 1844. Later in the same year, Lady Eleonora Butler presented the marble as a gift to the Museum Capitoline in Rome. The master apparently tried to impart features found on the Vasari fresco in Palazzo Vecchio to his model. Proof is found in the characteristic long beard, as well as in the shape of the nose, eyebrows and half-face. Apolloni, Vincenzo di Marco Fabio. ‘Bust of Benvenuto Cellini’. Marble. (1844). Museum Capitoline, Rome

Sculpture by Ulisse Cambi 
The architect Giorgio Vasari and his successor Bernardo Buontoletti left 28 spare niches in the walls of colonnade of the Uffizi palace. A portrait of Benvenuto Cellini made by Ulisse Cambi (1807–1895) was installed in one of the niches. A marble statue more than 3 meters tall was unveiled to the public the 24th of June in 1845.

The portrait is entirely the plot of Cambi's imagination. His interpretation of Benvenuto's image and sculpture as a whole triggered sharp criticism from the public.

Bust by Raffaello Romanelli 
Raffaello Romanelli’s bust of Benvenuto Cellini was placed in the middle of the Old Bridge (Ponte Vecchio) in Florence in 1901. Romanelli had given his own facial traits to Cellini's bust on Ponte Vecchio.

Stylistic differences between self-portraits and portraits of Cellini 
All the self-portraits by Benvenuto Cellini correspond to his literary self-portrayal in presenting him as a heroic personality. The heroic nature of artistic images is achieved with the help of a technique discovered by Michelangelo and known as «terribilità». This is created by frowning the brows and bearing a confident look in the eyes. Cellini's appearance has numerous characteristics, some of which can be considered as his distinctive features:

•  broad cheekbones

•  an underdeveloped and somewhat protruding mandible, with the lower lip over biting the upper lip

•  a large nose which is thin and straight at the bridge, but has a thickening and a small dimple on the tip

•  green-greyish eyes which appear to be set close to the bridge of the nose;

•  almond-shaped eyelids

•  rather thick eyebrows although in some self-portraits Cellini tried to make them less expressed

•  Cellini began to grow bald early, but the process slowed down with age; in spite of that, Benvenuto Cellini had lost his hair on the top of his head by the age of 50

•  thin and strong hands

•  an athletic build and straight posture, which Cellini preserved throughout his life.

Cellini tended to idealize and heroicize his appearance. In some instances, the “improvements” of his facial features were excessive.

References

Portraits by Italian artists
16th-century portraits
Cultural depictions of Benvenuto Cellini